DXPT-TV, channel 48, is a local television station which serves as an affiliate of the Philippine government-owned People's Television Network and operated by the Provincial Government of Davao del Norte. Its broadcast facilities are situated at the Provincial Capitol Compound, Brgy. Mankilam, Tagum City, Davao del Norte.

PTV DavNor 48's programs mainly focused on the projects and programs of the Davao del Norte's government under the leadership of Governor Edwin Jubahib, exclusive coverage of the province's festivities and events, and local newscasts. In-house programs from the mother station of PTV in Metro Manila (including Rise and Shine Pilipinas, Sentro Balita, Ulat Bayan and PTV News Tonight) are also shown in the station.

History
On October 28, 2016, PTV and the Provincial Government of Davao del Norte signed a memorandum of agreement to operate a local television station in the province, as part of the commemoration of the Press Freedom Month.

PTV DavNor 48's license to operate issued by the National Telecommunications Commission (BSD-0176–2017) was approved on March 15, 2017, and expires on March 14, 2020. Two months later, On June 16, 2017, PTV DavNor 48 officially commenced its broadcasts, in time for the 50th Anniversary of the establishment of Davao del Norte.

Programs

Currently aired programs
PTV News Davao del Norte - flagship weekly newscast featuring news and events from the Provincial Government of Davao del Norte Philippines
DavNor Sayron Ta
Kapihan sa Kapitolyo
Abante Norte
Bida ang Bata
Game Na!
Yes sa Probinsya

Past programs
LakwaCha
UsaPangkalusugan

See also
People's Television Network
List of People's Television Network stations and channels

References

Television stations in the Philippines
People's Television Network stations